Calvary Episcopal Church is a historic Episcopal church building at 1101 Howard Avenue in Utica, Oneida County, New York.  It was built in 1870-1872 and is an asymmetrically massed, cruciform plan structure with a rectangular nave and intersecting apse, with a substantial engaged corner tower.

It was designed by noted New York City architect Henry M. Congdon. It is currently home to the Cathedral of the Theotokos of Great Grace.

It was listed on the National Register of Historic Places in 2008.

References

External links
 Cathedral of the Most Holy Theotokos - Our Lady of Grace website

Episcopal church buildings in New York (state)
Churches on the National Register of Historic Places in New York (state)
Gothic Revival church buildings in New York (state)
Churches completed in 1872
19th-century Episcopal church buildings
Churches in Utica, New York
Churches in Oneida County, New York
National Register of Historic Places in Oneida County, New York